Adenocarpus hispanicus is a species of flowering plant in the Faboideae subfamily that is endemic to the Iberian Peninsula in Spain and Portugal.

References

External links
Adenocarpus hispanicus (as Adenocarpus argyrophyllus)

Genisteae
Flora of Europe
Flora of Portugal
Flora of Spain